Kerwin Lamar Moore (born October 29, 1970) is an American former professional baseball outfielder. He played for the Oakland Athletics of the Major League Baseball (MLB) in 1996.

References

External links

1970 births
Living people
African-American baseball players
American expatriate baseball players in Canada
American expatriate baseball players in Mexico
Appleton Foxes players
Baseball City Royals players
Baseball players from Detroit
Catskill Cougars players
Edmonton Trappers players
Eugene Emeralds players
Gulf Coast Royals players
High Desert Mavericks players
Huntsville Stars players
Major League Baseball outfielders
Memphis Chicks players
Modesto A's players
Oakland Athletics players
Rojos del Águila de Veracruz players
Tri-City Posse players
21st-century African-American sportspeople
20th-century African-American sportspeople